Sail Croatia is a British-based cruise line operating in the Adriatic Sea, along the Dalmatian coast of Croatia. It promotes an ecological initiative called Green Sail.

History 
Sail Croatia was founded in the UK by Grant Seuren, and his wife Helle Seuren in 2005. Grant was born in New Zealand, and his wife Helle is Danish.

Cruising vessels and yachts 
In 2013, the line had four chartered motorized cruising vessels. Along with sailing, the offer included kayaking and rafting on the mainland and buggy safaris on the islands. Its "Cycle Croatia" cruises are trips where tourists sail the Adriatic, and cycle a total of 189 km in seven days or less. The motor yachts, which take up to 40 passengers, are based in Split Marina.

Sail Croatia operates small ship cruises called "Elegance" cruises, onboard its luxury vessels including Olimp (2017), which carries up to 38 passengers and departs from Split or Dubrovnik. Other cruising options include sightseeing cruises called "Explorer" cruises, party cruises called "Navigator" cruises, hiking cruises called "Hike Croatia" and cycling cruises called "Cycle Croatia". All cruises have seven-day itineraries and typically run between April and October every year. Sail Croatia also offers private skippered yacht tours and chartered yacht sailings.

Green Sail initiative and ecotourism
The Green Sail initiative began in 2014 to educate cruise lines, sailors, and tourists about the importance of sorting and recycling waste on the Adriatic, and on the problem of discharging black wastewater from various types of vessels in Croatia. It also provides recreational sailors with hand nets to use in waste removal from the sea. By mid-2017, it had managed to gather 500 charter lines and partner marinas.

Green Sail also organizes cleanup initiatives along the Dalmatian coastline, with volunteers removing up to nine cubic meters of waste from the sea in one clean up.

See also

List of cruise lines

External links
Sail Croatia's Official Website

References

British companies established in 2005
Cruise lines
Travel and holiday companies of the United Kingdom
2005 establishments in England